Hero Sharqi is a town and union council of Dera Ghazi Khan District in the Punjab province of Pakistan. The town is part of Taunsa Tehsil.

Main tribe 
TANGWANI  balouch is the most prominent tribe of this area other are, Syed, Qureshi, lashari, qasrani etc.
.

References

Populated places in Dera Ghazi Khan District
Union councils of Dera Ghazi Khan District
Cities and towns in Punjab, Pakistan